In mathematics, infinite difference methods are numerical methods for solving differential equations by approximating them with difference equations, in which infinite differences approximate the derivatives.

See also
 Infinite element method
 Finite difference
 Finite difference time domain

References

 Simulation of ion transfer under conditions of natural convection by the finite difference method
 .
 Genetic Algorithm and Numerical Solution

Finite differences
Numerical differential equations